Annette Heffernan is a former netball player who played for New Zealand on nine occasions between 1985 and 1990.

Early life
Annette Heffernan (née Blomquist) was born on 4 November 1962. Her sister, Maxine Blomquist, was also a netball player who represented New Zealand and, until 2016, they were the only sisters who had played for the team.

Netball career
Heffernan played netball for Canterbury. A player who could cover all defensive positions, she was first chosen to play for the Silver Ferns, the New Zealand national netball team, in a match against England in February 1985, in a tournament in Australia that also included the hosts and Trinidad and Tobago. She was selected to play for the Silver Ferns in the 1987 World Netball Championships, held in Glasgow, Scotland, but ended up playing in only one match because of a knee injury. New Zealand won that tournament. Recovering from the injury, Heffernan was selected again in 1988, 1989 and 1990.

Family
Heffernan married Noel Heffernan, who played rugby for Canterbury Country. They are parents of identical twin daughters. Kate Heffernan has played cricket for New Zealand and in December 2021 was selected for the 17-member squad for the Silver Ferns. Like her sister, Georgia Heffernan has played netball for the Southern Steel, an ANZ Premiership team based in Invercargill. Both attended Saint Hilda's Collegiate School in Dunedin, where their mother assisted with the netball coaching. In 2019 she also coached the Eastern Southland netball team, in which her daughters played.

References

1962 births
Living people
New Zealand international netball players
1987 World Netball Championships players